Kurkimakhi (Dargwa: Куркимахьи) is a rural locality (a selo) in Akushinsky  District, Republic of Dagestan, Russia. The population was 396 as of 2010. There are 3 streets.

Geography 
Kurkimakhi is located 13 km southeast of Akusha (the district's administrative centre) by road, on the Dargolakotta River. Ginta is the nearest rural locality.

References 

Rural localities in Akushinsky District